These are the episodes that have been in the CBBC Television Series Evacuation. The first series was simply called "Evacuation", while the second series was titled "Evacuation - To the Manor House". Altogether there are 20 episodes. The first series ran in September 2006 – with Episodes 5 to 10 being broadcast in pairs back-to-back, i.e. as 'double-bills' – and the second series ran from January to February 2008.

The episode titles given here have merely been devised to convey the flavour of each instalment, and were not shown on-screen.

Series One (2006) 
Arrival at Castle Farm  4 September 2006
Collecting Eggs         5 September 2006
Postcards Home          6 September 2006
The Anderson Shelter    7 September 2006
The Warden              8 September 2006 (double-bill)
Wash Day                8 September 2006          
Private Pickard         11 September 2006 (double-bill)
The Vicar Comes to Tea  11 September 2006 
American Dancing        12 September 2006 (double-bill)
The End of the War      12 September 2006

Series Two (To The Manor House) (2008) 
Arrival at Pradoe Hall    17 January 2008
Lunch with Lady Olstead   18 January 2008
School with Miss Young    24 January 2008
Miss Young's PE Lesson    25 January 2008               
A Night in the Cellar     31 January 2008
Pheasant Shooting Season  1 February 2008
The New Arrival           7 February 2008
The Fete                  8 February 2008
The Upper Class           14 February 2008
Going Home                15 February 2008

Evacuation